Nuclear transcription factor Y subunit alpha is a protein that in humans is encoded by the NFYA gene.

Function 

The protein encoded by this gene is one subunit of a trimeric complex NF-Y, forming a highly conserved transcription factor that binds to CCAAT motifs in the promoter regions in a variety of genes. Subunit NFYA associates with a tight dimer composed of the NFYB and NFYC subunits, resulting in a trimer that binds to DNA with high specificity and affinity. The sequence specific interactions of the complex are made by the NFYA subunit, suggesting a role as the regulatory subunit. In addition, there is evidence of post-transcriptional regulation in this gene product, either by protein degradation or control of translation. Further regulation is represented by alternative splicing in the glutamine-rich activation domain, with clear tissue-specific preferences for the two isoforms.

NF-Y complex serves as a pioneer factor by promoting chromatin accessibility to facilitate other co-localizing cell type-specific transcription factors.

NF-Y has also been implicated as a central player in transcription start site (TSS) selection in animals. It safeguards the integrity of the nucleosome-depleted region and PIC localization at protein-coding gene promoters.

Interactions 

NFYA has been shown to interact with Serum response factor and ZHX1. NFYA, NFYB and NFYC form the NFY complex and it has been shown that the NFY complex serves as a pioneer factor by promoting chromatin accessibility to facilitate other co-localizing cell type-specific transcription factors.

References

Further reading

External links 
 
 

Transcription factors